Duran or Durán is a Spanish surname that may refer to the following people:

Arts

Actors
 Dan Duran (broadcaster), Canadian television entertainment journalist and actor
 Rafael Durán (1911–1994), Spanish actor
 Tita Duran (1929–1991), Filipina film actress

Artists
 Carolus-Duran (Charles Auguste Émile Durand; 1837–1917), French painter
 Tony Duran (photographer), American photographer
 Victorina Durán (1899–1993), Spanish artist

Musicians and composers
 Alejo Durán (1919–1989), Colombian composer, singer and accordionist
 Dolores Duran (1930–1959), Brazilian singer and composer
 Domingo Marcos Durán (c.1465–1529), Spanish music theorist and choirmaster
 Eddie Duran (1925–2019), American jazz guitarist
 Elena Duran (born 1949), Mexican American flautist
 Gustavo Durán (1906–1969), Spanish composer, soldier and diplomat
 Hilario Durán (born 1953), Cuban jazz pianist
 Ivan Duran, Belizean music producer and musician
 Joaquín Valverde Durán (1846–1910), Spanish composer, conductor and flautist
 Lucy Durán, UK-based ethnomusicologist, record producer and radio presenter
 Tony Duran, member of the American band Ruben and the Jets

Writers
 Aaron Duran (born 1976), American writer and media producer
 Diego Durán (1537–1588), 16th century chronicler of the Aztecs
 Jane Duran (born 1944), Cuban-born poet
 José María Pasquini Durán (1939–2010), Argentine journalist

Politics
 Andrés Durán Hareau, Uruguayan diplomat
 Blanca Inés Durán Hernández (born 1971), Colombian politician
 Crisanta Duran (born 1980), American politician in Colorado
 Dianna Duran (born 1956), American politician in New Mexico
 Enric Duran (born 1976), Catalan anticapitalist activist
 Florencio Durán (1893–1978), President of the Senate of Chile from 1941 to 1944
 Francisco Martin Duran (born 1968), American criminal who attempted to assassinate President Bill Clinton in 1994
 Germán García Durán, Colombian diplomat
 John Duran, American politician in California
 Josep Antoni Duran i Lleida (born 1952), Spanish politician
 Luisa Durán (born 1941), former First Lady of Chile
 Sixto Durán Ballén (1921–2016), former president of Ecuador

Sports

Baseball and softball
 Andrea Duran (born 1984), American softball player
 Dan Duran (baseball) (born 1954), American baseball player
 Ezequiel Durán (born 1999), Dominican baseball player
 Germán Durán (born 1984), Mexican-American baseball player
 Jarren Duran (born 1996), American baseball player
 Jhoan Durán (born 1998), Dominican baseball player
 Roberto Durán (baseball) (born 1973), Dominican baseball player

Boxing and martial arts
 Jacob Duran (born 1951), American cutman
 José Durán (born 1945), Spanish boxer
 Massimiliano Duran (born 1963), Italian boxer
 Ossie Duran (born 1977 as Osumanu Yahaya), Ghanaian boxer
 Reuben Duran (born 1983), American mixed martial artist
 Roberto Durán (born 1951), Panamanian former professional boxer

Football (soccer)
 Antonio Durán (1924–2009), Spanish football player and manager
 Francisco Manuel Durán (born 1988), Spanish footballer
 Hugo González Durán (born 1990), Mexican footballer
 Luís Marcelo Durán (born 1974), Uruguayan footballer
 Manuel Agudo Durán (born 1986), Spanish footballer
 Rubén Durán (born 1983), Spanish footballer
 Sargon Duran (born 1987), Austrian footballer

Other
 Arkaitz Durán (born 1986), Spanish racing cyclist
 Cassius Duran (born 1979), Brazilian diver
 Rafael Duran (born 1938), Venezuelan former Olympic wrestler
 Salvador Durán (born 1985), Mexican racing driver
 Sergi Durán (born 1976), Spanish tennis player

Other
 Agustín Durán (1789–1862), Spanish scholar
 Alfredo Duran (born 1936), Cuban-born American lawyer
 Andrés Durán (born 1966), Colombian rock historian, radio broadcaster and producer
 Desiree Durán (born 1985), Bolivian model and beauty contestant
 Elvis Duran (born 1964), American radio host
 Enver Duran (born 1945), Turkish medic and educator
 Franklin Duran (born 1967), Venezuelan entrepreneur
 George Duran (born 1975), American chef and entertainer
 Inés García de Durán (1928–2011), Colombian folklorist
 Jaime González Durán (born 1971), Mexican drug trafficker
 José Durán (disambiguation), multiple people
 Khalid Duran (1939–2010), scholar of the Islamic world
 Manuel Garcia-Duran, Spanish businessman
 María Ángeles Durán (born 1942), Spanish sociologist
 Maria Duran ( 1710 – ?), Portuguese nun
 Narciso Durán (1776–1846), Franciscan friar and missionary
 Profiat Duran, Catalan physician, philosopher, grammarian, and controversialist
 Simeon ben Zemah Duran (1361–1444), also known as the Rashbatz, Majorcan Rabbinical authority and medic
 Solomon ben Simon Duran (1400–1467), also known as the Rashbash, Algerian rabbi

Spanish-language surnames